Barry Myers may refer to:

Barry Myers (baseball) (1938/9–2017), American baseball coach
Barry Myers (director) (1937–2016), English film director
Barry Lee Myers, American attorney and businessman